Khek Noi is a tambon (subdistrict) of Khao Kho District, in Phetchabun Province, Thailand. In 2017 it had a total population of 15,382 people.

History
The subdistrict was created effective August 10, 1989 by splitting off 6 administrative villages from Khaem Son.

Administration

Central administration
The tambon is subdivided into 12 administrative villages (muban).

Local administration
The whole area of the subdistrict is covered by the subdistrict administrative organization (SAO) Khek Noi (องค์การบริหารส่วนตำบลเข็กน้อย).

References

External links
Thaitambon.com on Khek Noi

Tambon of Phetchabun Province
Populated places in Phetchabun province